George Sampson Valentine Wills (1849-1932) was a chemist and pharmacist and the founder of the Westminster College of Chemistry and Pharmacy, an institution which prepared students for examinations set by the Pharmaceutical Society of Great Britain, founded in 1841.

Early life

George Sampson Valentine Wills was born on 14 February 1849 in the village of Roade in Northamptonshire, England. He was the son of stonemason Jabez Wills and the grandson of George Wills, a stonemason from Buckinghamshire. His mother Catherine Hickson was the daughter of a local labourer, William Hickson. Later, Wills was educated in Stony Stratford, Buckinghamshire and, after leaving school, in 1866, Wills was apprenticed to a local chemist and druggist.

Career

In October 1874 Wills founded the Westminster College of Chemistry and Pharmacy, initially located in his house at 133 St George's Road, Lambeth, London. Students of the college took the examination of the Pharmaceutical Society of Great Britain, founded in 1841.

By 1877 the college was able to make the claim that it was the largest school of its kind in London. In addition, its students had achieved almost as many examination passes as all the other schools in England put together.

In 1880 Wills published a book titled Elements of Pharmacy.

In 1882, as his student body expanded, Wills moved Westminster College into new premises, a defunct Baptist chapel in Trinity Street, Southwark.

In 1899 Wills self-published a memoir titled The Works of George S. V. Wills and The Westminster College of Chemistry and Pharmacy.

Death and legacy
George Sampson Valentine Wills died at 5 Lessar Avenue, Clapham Park on 28 April 1932, aged 84. He is buried in Kensal Green Cemetery, Kensal Green, London.

Notes

References

External links
George S. V. Wills at findagrave.com Retrieved 7 March 2019

English chemists